Opydorscus fonsecae is a species of tardigrades. It is the only species in the genus Opydorscus, part of the family Halechiniscidae and the subfamily Orzeliscinae. The species has been found on the Brazilian coast of the South Atlantic Ocean. The genus and the species were named by Jeanne Renaud-Mornant in 1983.

References

Further reading
Renaud-Mornant, 1989: "Opydorscus, un nouveau genre d'Orzeliscinae et sa signification phylogénique (Tardigrada, Arthrotardigrada)". [Opydorscos: A New Genus of Orzeliscinae and its Phylogenic Signification] Bulletin of the Muséum National d'Histoire Naturelle Section A: Zoology, Biology and Animal Ecology, vol. 11, no. 4, p. 763-771

Halechiniscidae
Fauna of the Atlantic Ocean
Endemic fauna of Brazil
Animals described in 1989
Taxa named by Jeanne Renaud-Mornant